Based in Brazil, Clube do Hardware (meaning "Hardware Club" in Brazilian Portuguese) is one of the largest websites about computers in South America and also one of the biggest in the world. According to Alexa, as of 2018, Clube do Hardware is the 185th most accessed website in Brazil.

Clube do Hardware publishes tutorials, articles, reviews, and news about computer hardware and has a very active forum where users can discuss technology topics.

It has a very engaged community, with the largest Brazilian team at the Folding@Home project.

History
It was created in 1996 by the Brazilian PC hardware expert Gabriel Torres, initially as a personal webpage on Geocities with the title "Hardware by Gabriel Torres" as a portfolio of his work. In 1997 the author registered the domain gabrieltorres.com with the website, changing its name to "Hardware Site." The final name, Clube do Hardware, was adopted in 1999.

References

External links
 

Computing websites
Online computer magazines
Internet forums
Magazines established in 1996
Magazines published in Brazil
Portuguese-language magazines